Cisy  is a village in the administrative district of Gmina Prostki, within Ełk County, Warmian-Masurian Voivodeship, in northern Poland.

The most famous family to have originated from here are the Szelemej's. Founded by an unknown patriarchal Szelemej, Ivan, Dmytro, Hryhory, Ihor, and Pavlo Szelemej are the successors of the dynasty.

References

Cisy